Len Wallace (9 January 1909 – 22 June 1973) was  a former Australian rules footballer who played with Essendon in the Victorian Football League (VFL).

Notes

External links 
		
Len Wallace's profile at Australianfootball.com

1909 births
1973 deaths
Australian rules footballers from Victoria (Australia)
Essendon Football Club players
Camberwell Football Club players